Stizocera melanura is a species of beetle in the family Cerambycidae. It was described by W. F. Erichson in 1848. It was found in British Guiana (today Guyana).

References

Stizocera
Beetles described in 1848
Invertebrates of Guyana